Our Lady of Perpetual Help, also known as St. Mary's Catholic Church, is a historic church just north of Altus, Arkansas.  It is located on Franklin County Road 521, just outside the city limits.  The Romanesque church building was built in 1902.  The church is known for its Sistine Chapel-style paintings and grand Roman Basilical architecture. Brown stone blocks cover the outside of the church, and the inside walls are lined with ornate gold leaf. The organ inside the church is over 100 years old, as is the bell tower.  The church was listed on the National Register of Historic Places in 1976.

Notes

1902 establishments in Arkansas
Churches in the Roman Catholic Diocese of Little Rock
Churches on the National Register of Historic Places in Arkansas
Roman Catholic churches completed in 1902
Churches in Franklin County, Arkansas
National Register of Historic Places in Franklin County, Arkansas
20th-century Roman Catholic church buildings in the United States